Independent Division of Jiangxi Provincial Military District()(1st Formation) was formed in 1966 from the Public Security Contingent of Jiangxi province. The division was composed of three regiments (1st to 3rd).

In October 1969 the division moved to Xiamen, Fujian as the replacement of 93rd Army Division, and renamed as 4th Garrison Division of Fuzhou Military Region().

In December 1969, all its regiments were renamed as follows:
12th Garrison Regiment (former 1st);
13th Garrison Regiment (former 2nd);
14th Garrison Regiment (former 3rd).

On February 1 1970, the division merged with Xiamen Military Sub-district and became Xiamen Garrison District. 

In December 1980, Xiamen Garrison District was renamed as 4th Garrison Division of Fuzhou Military Region again.

The division was then composed of:
12th Garrison Regiment;
13th Garrison Regiment;
14th Garrison Regiment;
15th Garrison Regiment;
Artillery Regiment;
Shipping Group.

In October 1985 the division was inactivated and became Xiamen Garrison District again.

References

G4F
Military units and formations established in 1966
Military units and formations disestablished in 1985